MMN80CPU is a Z80A microprocessor clone, working at 3.5 MHz. It was produced from 1988 onwards at Microelectronica Bucharest for Romanian 8 bit computers such as HC, CIP, JET, TIM-S, CoBra and others.

References

8-bit microprocessors
Science and technology in Romania